The 1973–74 Michigan Wolverines men's basketball team represented the University of Michigan in intercollegiate college basketball during the 1973–74 season. The team played its home games in the Crisler Arena in Ann Arbor, Michigan, and was a member of the Big Ten Conference.

Under the direction of head coach Johnny Orr, the team tied with the Indiana Hoosiers  for the Big Ten championship.  The team earned the first of four consecutive NCAA Division I men's basketball tournament invitations.

Campy Russell and C. J. Kupec served as team captains, with Russell earning team MVP honors. Russell, the Consensus second team All-American, earned the Big Ten scoring championship with a 24.0 average in conference games. He also won the Chicago Tribune Silver Basketball as Big Ten Most Valuable Player.  Orr was named Big Ten Coach of the Year.

Although the team began the season unranked, it was in the Associated Press Top Twenty Poll for twelve of the eighteen weeks during the season, rising as high as number six, where it finished the season.  The team ended the season ranked twelfth in the final UPI Coaches' Poll.

The team set a school record for single-game assists on February 23, 1974, against Purdue with 32.  The record would stand until March 7, 1987.

In the 25-team 1974 NCAA Division I men's basketball tournament, Michigan reached the elite eight in the Mideast region by earning a bye and defeating the Notre Dame Fighting Irish 77–68. The team then fell to the Marquette Warriors 72–70.

Roster

Rankings

Team players drafted into the NBA
Five players from this team were selected in the NBA Draft.

See also
 1974 in Michigan

References

Michigan
Michigan
Michigan Wolverines men's basketball seasons
Michigan Wolve
Michigan Wolve